The Pléiade encyclopedia (fr:Encyclopédie de la Pléiade) is a collection of Éditions Gallimard, publishing encyclopedic-type scientific texts on major fields of knowledge. It is part of the Bibliothèque de la Pléiade, of which it takes the format and aesthetics of the books, with stars on the back.

The publication extended from 1956 to 1991. The creation of this collection was entrusted to Raymond Queneau. Some of the volumes have been reprinted in the Folio Essais collection.

List of volumes
The Pleiade encyclopedia includes 49 volumes, the information for the first edition of which is detailed in the following table:

References

French encyclopedias